Convoy is a 13-episode American television show set during World War II that appeared on NBC for the 1965–1966 television season.

The series starred John Gavin as Commander Dan Talbot of the US Navy destroyer escort DD-181 and John Larch as civilian merchant Captain Ben Foster of the cargo ship Flagship, who were involved with the convoy ships and their escorts that help to transport food, supplies and war materials across the Atlantic during the Battle of the Atlantic.

The series also featured Linden Chiles as Steve Kirk and James T. Callahan, formerly of ABC's Wendy and Me sitcom, in the role of Lieutenant O'Connell. Among the guest stars were Dennis Hopper, Jack Palance, Barbara Rush, James Doohan, Leslie Nielsen, Horst Ebersberg, Harold Gould, and Jeremy Slate.

Production
A pilot was announced in late 1964.

NBC was worried about getting women into the series but research revealed that hundreds of females travelled in convoys. "The opportunity to exploit romance as well as action is obviously evident, and believe me we are going to take advantage of it", said writer-producer Frank Price.

Price called the show "technically... the greatest production challenge on the tube today. You can't fool TV audiences these days because they don't expect anything less, realistically or dramatically, from a TV episode than from a war movie."

The series relied heavily on stock footage from the war. This meant it could not be shot in colour and Convoy was one of the last NBC series in black and white. As a result, several NBC affiliates refused to clear the program. Price also travelled to San Diego to shoot 75,000 feet of footage involving ships that remained from World War II.

Former naval officer John Gavin admitted sometimes he had trouble with dramatic licence taken by the writers.

The program rated poorly from the beginning, struggling against Gomer Pyle and The Addams Family and notice of its axing came after a few weeks.

Episodes

References

External links 

1965 American television series debuts
1965 American television series endings
NBC original programming
Black-and-white American television shows
English-language television shows
Television series based on actual events
Television series by Universal Television
American military television series
World War II television drama series